Annat (Scottish Gaelic: An Annaid) is a small village at the eastern end of Upper Loch Torridon in Wester Ross, in the Highland council area of Scotland. It is about 2 km south-east of the village of Torridon, on the A896 singletrack road.

References

Populated places in Ross and Cromarty